Lee Alvin DuBridge was an American educator and physicist, best known as president of the California Institute of Technology from 1946–1969.

Background
His father was Fred DuBridge, a football coach at Indiana State Normal School. He graduated from Cornell College in 1922, and then began a teaching assignment at the University of Wisconsin–Madison, from which he received an M.A. degree in 1924 and a Ph.D. in 1926. DuBridge continued his academic work at the California Institute of Technology, as assistant, then associate professor at Washington University in St. Louis (1928–1934), and the University of Rochester.

Career

Academia
At Rochester, DuBridge began a long career as an academic administrator, serving as dean of the faculty of arts and sciences. On leave from Rochester between 1940 and 1946, he became the founding director of the Radiation Laboratory at MIT. In 1946, DuBridge began serving as president of the California Institute of Technology through 1969.

Civil service
In 1958, he, along with William A. Fowler, Max Mason, Linus Pauling, and Bruce H. Sage, was awarded the Medal for Merit. DuBridge served as presidential Science Advisor under President Harry S. Truman from 1952–53 and under President Dwight D. Eisenhower from 1953-55, and (after retiring from Caltech) under President Richard Nixon from 1969–70.

Associations
DuBridge served on boards for: RAND Corporation (1948–1961), National Science Board (1950–1954), Western College Association (president, 1950–1951), Carnegie Endowment for International Peace (1951–1957), Air Pollution Foundation (1953–1961), Institute for Defense Analysis (1956–1960), Rockefeller Foundation (1956–1976), National Science Board (vice chair, 1958–1964), Board of Governors for the Los Angeles Town Hall (1959–1963), Edison Foundation (1960–1968), KCET (1962–1968), Huntington Library (1962–1968), and National Educational Television (1964–1968).

Personal and death

Awards
 1943: National Academy of Sciences
 1947: Research Corporation Award
 1948: United States Medal for Merit
 1967: Governor's Award, National Academy of Television Arts & Sciences
 1968: Sesquicentennial Award, University of Michigan
 1969: Lehman Award, New York Academy of Sciences
 1974: Golden Plate Award, Academy of Achievement
 1982: Vannevar Bush Award, National Science Foundation
 Minor planet 5678 DuBridge discovered by Eleanor Helin is named in his honor.

References

External links

 Oral history interview transcript with Lee DuBridge on 13 December 1968, American Institute of Physics, Niels Bohr Library & Archives
 Oral history interview transcript with Lee DuBridge on 9 June 1972, American Institute of Physics, Niels Bohr Library & Archives
 Oral history interview transcript with Lee DuBridge on 14 February 1986, American Institute of Physics, Niels Bohr Library & Archives
 Oral history interview transcript with Lee DuBridge on 6 March 1987, American Institute of Physics, Niels Bohr Library & Archives
 
 
 
 
 
 
 
 

|-

|-

1901 births
1994 deaths
20th-century American physicists
California Institute of Technology faculty
Deaths from pneumonia in California
Fellows of the American Physical Society
Medal for Merit recipients
Office of Science and Technology Policy officials
People from Terre Haute, Indiana
Presidents of the California Institute of Technology
University of Rochester faculty
University of WisconsinMadison alumni
Vannevar Bush Award recipients
Washington University physicists
Washington University in St. Louis faculty
Presidents of the American Physical Society